Sarwar Sultana Begum or (Ulya (Ulli) Hazrat) (1875 – 1965), was an Afghan royal consort. She was married to Habibullah Khan (r. 1901–1919), and was the mother of king Amanullah Khan (r. 1919–1929).

Life

Early life and marriage
She was the daughter of Loinab Sher Dil Khan of Shaghasi, Governor of Balkh. Her sister, Tajawar Sultana married Sardar Mohammad Ali Khan Mohammadzai and they had two sons, Sardar Younus Khan and Sardar Mohammad Wali Jan. Her brother, Loinab Khush Dil Khan (born 1844) was the father of Loinab Ali Ahmad Khan. He was married to Princess Sahira Begum Siraj Al Banat, Sarwar Sultana's daughter.

She was one of the many wives of king Habibullah Khan. Like his predecessors, Habibullah Khan had four official wives and a large number of unofficial wives as well as slave concubines in the royal Harem Sara palace complex in Kabul. Her husband was known to have even more wives than was common, having at least 44 official or unofficial wives, among them Ulya Janab, but Sarwar Sultana Begum was one of his four main wives. 

In 1919, her son succeeded to the throne, giving her a prominent position as the king's mother.

King's mother
She had an influential position at court during the reign of her son. Her son enacted a radical modernisation of the country, which included a reform in the position of women. This affected the royal court as well, as he dissolved the royal harem and freed the enslaved bonds women of the Harem Sara palace complex. 

She was described by the Swedish memoir writer Aurora Nilsson, who lived in Afghanistan with her Afghan husband in 1926–27. Nilsson visited the royal court in Paghman and Darullaman, and includes descriptions in her book of queen consort Soraya Tarzi well as the mother of the king. With their encouragement, Nilsson talked to them about European customs.  Nilsson befriended the king's mother, whom she describes as influential and dominant, demonstrated dance and gymnastics for her and acted as her photographer.  Nilsson described the king's mother as supportive of his modernisation reforms, and eager to assist her daughter-in-law in her role as a role model for a new modern Afghan woman. Her daughters also notably adopted Western fashion. She was noted to be tall and strict.

Later life and death
Her son was deposed in 1929, and left the country. She died in exile in Istanbul in 1965.

Issue
 Amanullah Khan, king 1919–1929
 Princess Sahira Begum Siraj Al Banat (born 1902), married in 1919 to General H.E. Taj-i-Afghan ‘Ali Ahmad Jan Shaghasi. She was the co-founder of the Anjuman-i Himayat-i-Niswan (1928) and the general director of the Masturat Hospital (1924).
 Princess Safariya Samar Al-Siraj (born 1904), married in 1920 to Field Marshal H.R.H. Sardar Shah Wali Khan Ghazi.
 Princess Razia Begum Noor Seraj (born 1909), married in 1927 to H.E. Sardar-i-Ala Muhammad Hasan Jan, GCVO (b. 1908), Court Chamberlain and Civil ADC to King Amanullah.

References 

1875 births
1965 deaths
Afghan royal consorts